Leikung is a spider genus of the jumping spider family, Salticidae.

Species
 Leikung kinabaluensis Benjamin, 2004 – Malaysia, Borneo
 Leikung porosa (Wanless, 1978) – Malaysia, Sumatra

References
  (2007): The world spider catalog, version 8.0. American Museum of Natural History.

Salticidae
Spiders of Asia
Salticidae genera